The Diamond Project was inaugurated May 27, 1992, at New York City Ballet with funding from the Irene Diamond Fund. It has presented — every two to four years — work by new choreographers.

Choreographers

1992 

  
David Allan
John Alleyne
Bart Cook
William Forsythe
Robert La Fosse
 
Miriam Mahdaviani
Peter Martins
Toni Pimble
Alexandre Proia
Richard Tanner
Lynne Taylor-Corbett

1994 

  
David Allan
John Alleyne
Ulysses Dove
Anna Laerkesen
Robert La Fosse
Miriam Mahdaviani
 
Trey McIntyre
Kevin O'Day
Peter Martins
Richard Tanner
Lynne Taylor-Corbett
Damian Woetzel

1997 

  
Christopher d'Amboise
Robert La Fosse
Miriam Mahdaviani
 
Kevin O'Day
Angelin Preljocaj
Christopher Wheeldon

2000 

  
Christopher d'Amboise
Miriam Mahdaviani
 
Kevin O'Day
Helgi Tomasson
Christopher Wheeldon

2002 

  
Melissa Barak
Stephen Baynes
Mauro Bigonzetti
 
Albert Evans
Miriam Mahdaviani
Peter Martins
Christopher Wheeldon

2006 

  
Mauro Bigonzetti
Jean-Pierre Bonnefoux
Jorma Elo *
 
Eliot Feld
Peter Martins
Alexei Ratmansky *
Christopher Wheeldon

Notes 

* first time choreographer has worked with NYCB

Articles 

 
June 20, 2006 John Rockwell, NY Times
April 28, 2006 Jennifer Dunning, NY Times
May 9, 2006 Deborah Jowitt, Village Voice

May 5, 2002 Anna Kisselgoff, NY Times
April 23, 2002 Kate Mattingly Moran, Village Voice
July 11, 2000 Deborah Jowitt, Village Voice
June 26, 1994 Anna Kisselgoff, NY Times

Reviews 

 
June 17, 2002 Anna Kisselgoff, NY Times
June 24, 2002 Jack Anderson, NY Times

May 10, 2002 Anna Kisselgoff, NY Times
May 6, 2002 Anna Kisselgoff, NY Times
June 29, 1997 Anna Kisselgoff, NY Times

 Diamond Project, New York City Ballet